The Rodillian Academy (formerly Rodillian School) is a mixed secondary School and sixth form with academy status located in Lofthouse, West Yorkshire, England. The school has 1,556 pupils aged between 11 and 18. The school also has Specialist Arts College status. The name 'Rodillian' is derived from the name that was given to former pupils of the Rothwell Grammar School.

History

The school was originally built in 1933 as Rothwell Grammar School to serve the needs of children in Rothwell and the surrounding areas. Edwin Robert Manley was headteacher from 1933 to 1965. He was active in local politics, and he wrote and self-published Meet the Miner.

In 2008 it moved into a £93 million building.

The school became an academy in summer 2012.

Rodillian Multi Academy Trust
In December 2013 the Rodillian Academy was approved by the Department for Education to become an academy sponsor. The Rodillian Multi Academy Trust was formed in September 2014 with the Rodillian Academy acting as the lead school in the trust that also includes The Featherstone Academy.

Inspections
In its most recent Ofsted inspection in 2016, the school's overall effectiveness was found to be 'good'. Both the effectiveness of the school's leadership and management and the personal development, behaviour and welfare pupils were judged to be outstanding.

Buildings
In September 2008, Rodillian moved to a newly built school as part of the Leeds BSF Project. At the new school are a lecture theatre, a library, sporting facilities including fitness centres and gyms, dance halls and PE classrooms. Part of the new build is a children's centre that allows for use of the school's sporting and educational facilities by children up to five years of age.

Rugby
The school's main sport was Rugby Union.

Academic performance
The school's academic performance has improved over the last 5 years and it is now regarded as one of the most improved schools in the North of England.  Rodillian has improved its exam results from 19% 5 A*-C including English and Maths in 2007 to 49% in 2010, 48% in 2011 and in 2012 64%

The school has also improved its percentage of pupils gaining 5 A*-C from 35% in 2007 to 87% in 2011.

Notable alumni

Rothwell Grammar School
 Jack Birkenshaw MBE – Cricketer
 Richard Newby, Baron Newby OBE – Liberal Democrat peer 101st Captain of the Sovereign's Body Guard
 John N. Reeve – Professor of Microbiology at Ohio State University
 Ian McNaught-Davis – mountaineer and broadcaster
 Jean Denton, Baroness Denton of Wakefield – racing driver, businesswoman, Conservative government minister
 Sir Hugh Fish CBE – Chairman of the Natural Environment Research Council from 1984–88, President of the Institute of Fisheries Management from 1987–99 and of the Freshwater Biological Association from 1972-74

Rodillian School

Carl Ablett – Leeds first team rugby league player

Mark Bell – musician, one half of LFO
Gareth Evans – former Leeds United, Huddersfield Town and Blackpool footballer
Alan Smith – former Leeds United, Manchester United and Newcastle United footballer
Robert Shaw Cameron – actor and theatre director

Notable teaching staff 

 Harry Gration –  journalist & broadcaster, former head of history

References

External links
 The Rodillian Academy official website
 The Rodillian OFSTED report
 EduBase
 School Net 
 Direct Government Website
 Official School Website
 Ofsted UK Schools Inspectors
 Ofsted 2008
 BSF Details

Secondary schools in Leeds
Educational institutions established in 1933
Academies in Leeds
1933 establishments in England
Rothwell, West Yorkshire